Morten Pettersen (18 May 1909 – 3 June 1982) was a Norwegian footballer. He played in five matches for the Norway national football team from 1930 to 1936.

References

External links
 

1909 births
1982 deaths
Norwegian footballers
Norway international footballers
Place of birth missing
Association footballers not categorized by position